Pavelló Club Joventut Badalona (also known as Pavelló dels Països Catalans) is an indoor arena located in Badalona, Catalonia, Spain. Built in 1972, it hosted the boxing events for the 1992 Summer Olympics. The arena has a capacity of 3,300 people.

References
1992 Summer Olympics official report.  Volume 2. pp. 280–3.

Buildings and structures completed in 1972
Venues of the 1992 Summer Olympics
Indoor arenas in Catalonia
Olympic boxing venues
Boxing venues in Spain